Henry Scrope, 3rd Baron Scrope of Masham (c. 1370–1415) was a favourite of King Henry V, beheaded for his involvement in the Southampton Plot.

Henry Scrope may also refer to:
Henry le Scrope (in or before 1268– 1336), English lawyer
Henry Scrope, 1st Baron Scrope of Masham (c. 1312–1392), English soldier and administrator
Henry Scrope, 4th Baron Scrope of Bolton (1418–1459)
Henry Scrope, 6th Baron Scrope of Bolton (c. 1468–1506)
Henry Scrope, 7th Baron Scrope of Bolton (c. 1480–1533)
Henry Scrope, 9th Baron Scrope of Bolton (c. 1534–1592)
Henry Scrope (died 1625) (c. 1570–1625), MP for Carlisle